Halyna Kruk (born 30 November 1974) is a Ukrainian writer, translator, educator and literary critic. Her surname also appears as Krouk.

Life
She was born in Lviv, Ukraine and was educated at the University of Lviv, earning a PhD in Ukrainian literature in 2001. She is a professor of literary studies at the university; her research focuses on medieval literature in the Ukraine.

Her first two collections of poetry were published in 1997: Mandry u Poshukakh Domu ("Journeys in Search of Home") and Slidy na Pisku ("Footprints on Sand"). She also writes poetry and fiction for children. Her books for children have been translated into 15 languages. Her poems have been translated into German and Russian. Her work has also been included in various anthologies.

Kruk translates other writers' work from Polish into Ukrainian.

Kruk has been vice-president of the Ukrainian branch of the writer's organisation PEN. In 1996–97, she won the literary competitions Ptyvitannia Zhyttia and Granoslov. In 2003, she was awarded the Gaude Polonia Fellowship by the Polish Ministry of Culture. In the same year, she won the Step by Step international competition for children's books. She has participated in the Baltic Centre for Writers and Translators' program.

Selected works 
 Marko Travels Around the World, children's literature (2003)
 It's Hard to Be the Youngest, children's literature (2003)
 Oblychchia poza svitlynoju ("The Face beyond the Photograph"), poetry (2005)

References 

1974 births
Living people
University of Lviv alumni
Academic staff of the University of Lviv
Ukrainian women poets
Ukrainian children's writers
Ukrainian translators